Kim Chang-ju (born September 20, 1985) is a South Korean sailor. He and Kim Ji-hoon placed 19th in the men's 470 event at the 2016 Summer Olympics.

References

External links
 
 
 

1985 births
Living people
South Korean male sailors (sport)
Olympic sailors of South Korea
Sailors at the 2016 Summer Olympics – 470
Asian Games medalists in sailing
Asian Games gold medalists for South Korea
Sailors at the 2014 Asian Games
Sailors at the 2018 Asian Games
Medalists at the 2014 Asian Games
People from Yeosu
Sportspeople from South Jeolla Province